Asian Australian history is the history of Asian ethnic and racial groups in Australia who trace their ancestry to Asia. The term Asian Australian, was first used in the 1950s by European Australians who wanted to strengthen diplomatic and trade ties with Asia for the benefit of the Australian community. The term was not originally used to describe or recognise the experiences of people of Asian descent living in Australia. It was only in the late 1980s and 1990s that the term "Asian Australian" was adopted and used by Asian Australians themselves to discuss issues related to racial vilification and discrimination. Today, the term "Asian Australian" is widely accepted and used to refer to people of Asian descent who are citizens or residents of Australia, though its usage and meaning may vary within the Asian Australian community.

Hostility to immigration 

Hostility towards Asian immigration in Australia has a long history, dating back to the implementation of the "White Australia" policy in 1901. This policy, which was in place until 1973, consisted of laws and policies aimed at excluding non-white immigrants, particularly those from Asia, from settling in the country. Despite efforts to reform or repeal the policy over the years, the legacy of the White Australia policy and hostility towards Asian immigration has persisted in various forms, including instances of racism and discrimination towards Asian Australians

Chronology

Early immigration 

 4000 years ago: Indians may have made it to Australia more than 4000 years before the British, according to evidence found in archaeology and genetics.

17th century 

 1606: The first recorded Filipino (a man named Ygnacio Corte-Real) arrives in Australia as a member of the crew of the Dutch ship Duyfken, which explored parts of Australia's coastline.

18th century 

 1788: The first recorded Chinese person, Mak Sai Ying, arrives in Australia as part of the First Fleet.

19th century 

 1800s: During the 19th century, Indians began to migrate to Australia as indentured labourers on sugar plantations in Queensland.
 1806: The first Chinese-born person, William Ah Sing, arrives in Australia.
 1817: Filipino sailors known as "Manilamen" begin to work on British and American whaling ships, including some that sail to Australia.
 1823 : First recorded Nepalese migrant to Australia, Darjee Doulat, arrives in New South Wales.
 1830s-1850s: Afghan traders, known as "Afghan cameleers," begin arriving in Australia to participate in the trade of goods and animals between South Australia and Western Australia
 1850s: The discovery of gold in New South Wales and Victoria leads to a significant influx of Chinese immigrants to Australia.
 1851: The first recorded Japanese person arrives in Australia.
 1860s: Japanese pearl divers begin working in the pearling industry in Northern Australia.
 1861: The Chinese Immigration Act is passed, which imposes a tax on Chinese immigrants in an effort to restrict their migration to Australia.
 1878: The first Japanese embassy to Australia is established.
 1880s: The first recorded arrival of Pakistanis in Australia is in the 1880s, when a small number of camel drivers, known as "Afghans," arrived in the country.  These men were primarily from what is now Pakistan and Afghanistan and were hired to help explore and open up new areas of Australia.
 1881: The Chinese Immigration Act is amended to exclude "all Chinese from entering the colony".
 1882: The first recorded Korean immigrants to Australia arrive in the country. John Corea, a sailor from the Korean peninsula, arrives in Sydney and becomes the first known Korean Australian.

20th century 

 Early 1900s: Indian migration to Australia slowed down and largely stopped due to the White Australia Policy, which restricted non-white immigration
 1900s: Pakistani immigration to Australia continues to be small and sporadic throughout the early 20th century Many Pakistanis who do come to Australia at this time are students or professionals, rather than labourers.
 1900-1945: During this time, a small number of Korean immigrants come to Australia to work as labourers, particularly on sugarcane farms in Queensland.
 1901: The Australian colonies unite to form the Commonwealth of Australia, and the new federal government passes the Immigration Restriction Act, which effectively bans non-European immigration to Australia.
 1901: Australia becomes a nation and the first federal parliament is established. Afghan cameleers and their families become Australian citizens.
 1914-1918: During World War I, Japan is a ally of Australia and many Japanese Australians serve in the Australian military.
 1920s-1930s: The construction of railways and improved transportation infrastructure leads to a decrease in the demand for cameleers and many Afghans return to Afghanistan or settle in other parts of Australia
 1939-1945: During World War II, Japan becomes a enemy of Australia and many Japanese Australians are interned as "enemy aliens".
 1942: The Australian government begins interning Japanese Australians, most of whom are Australian citizens. Many are sent to camps in New South Wales, Queensland, and South Australia.
 1945: World War II ends and the internment of Japanese Australians ends.
 1945: The Chinese Immigration Act is repealing and Chinese people are allowed to migrate to Australia again.
 1947: The first group of Afghan students arrive in Australia to study at Australian universities 
 1950s: The immigration policies of Australia become more relaxed in the 1950s, and the number of Pakistani immigrants begins to increase. Many of these immigrants are skilled workers who are recruited to help rebuild Australia after World War II
 1950s: Filipinos begin to migrate to Australia as students, professionals, and skilled workers.
 1950s-1960s: More Afghan students come to Australia to study, and some stay to work and settle permanently in the country
 1952: The White Australia Policy is officially dismantled.
 1950-1953: The Korean War takes place, leading to a large number of Korean refugees seeking asylum in countries around the world, including Australia.
 1954-1975: Vietnam War takes place, causing significant numbers of Vietnamese people to flee the country as refugees.
 1956: The first recorded arrival of Vietnamese immigrants in Australia took place, with three Vietnamese students arriving to study in Sydney.
 1960s : The Immigration Restriction Act 1901, also known as the White Australia Policy, is dismantled, leading to a rise in Indian immigration to Australia
 1960s: The number of Pakistani immigrants to Australia continues to increase in the 1960s, with many settling in larger cities such as Sydney and Melbourne
 1960s : Some Nepalese students come to Australia to study.
 1960s: Japanese immigration to Australia increases and the Japanese community begins to establish itself more permanently in the country.
 1960s: Taiwanese students begin studying in Australia, with the first group arriving in 1963 
 1962: The Australian government passes the Migration Act, which allows for the non-discriminatory selection of immigrants based on their skills and qualifications. This helps to increase the number of Korean immigrants coming to Australia.
 1970s: Indian students start coming to Australia for higher education.
 1970s: The Korean community in Australia begins to grow and become more established, with the opening of Korean language schools, churches, and cultural organizations.
 1970s: In the 1970s, the Pakistani community in Australia becomes more established and begins to form cultural and social organizations
 1970s: Cambodia experiences political instability and violence during the Khmer Rouge regime, leading many Cambodians to flee the country as refugees
 1970s: The Soviet invasion of Afghanistan leads to an increase in the number of Afghan refugees seeking asylum in Australia.
 1970s: The Taiwanese government begins encouraging emigration to developed countries, including Australia Many Taiwanese migrate to Australia for economic and political reasons.
 1971: Australia's first formal refugee program is established, which allows Vietnamese people displaced by the war to apply for entry to Australia.
 1971: The first Nepalese community organization, the Nepal Australia Association, is established in Adelaide, South Australia.
 1972: The first group of Vietnamese refugees arrive in Australia, consisting of 29 people sponsored by the Red Cross.
 1973: The Whitlam government formally apologises to the Chinese community for the discriminatory legislation passed in the past.
 1973-1975: The number of Vietnamese refugees arriving in Australia increases significantly, with many arriving by boat.
 1975: The Fall of Saigon on April 30 leads to a significant increase in the number of Vietnamese refugees arriving in Australia, with over 5,000 people arriving in the following months.
 1978: The first generation of Vietnamese Australians, who arrived as refugees in the 1970s, become eligible for citizenship.
 1979: Australia begins accepting Cambodian refugees for resettlement.
 1980s: Indian migration to Australia increases, with many Indians settling in Sydney and Melbourne
 1980s- Nepal becomes a major source of refugees due to political instability and human rights abuses. Many Nepalese refugees come to Australia through the Humanitarian Program.
 1980s: The Vietnamese Australian community begins to establish itself, with Vietnamese businesses and community organizations being established.
 1980s: In the 1980s, Pakistan becomes one of the top ten countries of origin for immigrants to Australia. Many Pakistanis come to the country as skilled workers or through family reunification programs
 1980s: Cambodian Australians begin to arrive in Australia in significant numbers, with many settling in Sydney and Melbourne.
 1989: The Australian government apologises to Japanese Australians for their internment during World War II.
 1990s: The number of Indians in Australia reaches 100,000
 1990s: The second generation of Vietnamese Australians, who were born in Australia to Vietnamese refugee parents, come of age.
 1990s: The number of Filipinos in Australia increases significantly, with many working as healthcare professionals and in other industries.
 1990s: The Korean community in Australia continues to grow, with many young Koreans coming to study at Australian universities.
 1990s: The Pakistani community in Australia continues to grow and thrive in the 1990s. Many Pakistanis who arrived in the country in earlier decades become Australian citizens and work to preserve their cultural heritage while also participating in mainstream Australian society.
 1990s: The number of Taiwanese immigrants to Australia increases significantly, with many settling in Melbourne and Sydney
 1992: The Human Rights and Equal Opportunity Commission releases the report "Nation to Nation", which documents the experiences of Chinese Australians and makes recommendations for reconciliation.
 1997- The Nepalese Australian Welfare Association is established in Adelaide to support newly arrived Nepalese refugees.
 1998- The Nepal Australia Community Services organization is established in Sydney to support the Nepalese community in New South Wales.
 1999: The Australia-Cambodia Migration and Cooperation Agreement is signed, allowing for the recruitment of Cambodian workers to fill labour shortages in certain industries in Australia.

21st century 

 Early 2000s: Indian migration to Australia continues to grow, with many Indians coming to Australia as skilled workers and professionals
 2000s- The Nepalese community in Australia continues to grow, with many Nepalese students coming to study in Australian universities.
 2000s: The Korean community in Australia becomes more diverse, with a mix of immigrants from both North and South Korea. The number of Korean-born Australians also increases, as more Korean couples choose to have children in Australia.
 2000s: The Taiwanese Australian community becomes more established and begins to actively participate in Australian society
 2001: The September 11th terrorist attacks in the United States lead to the invasion of Afghanistan by coalition forces. This results in a further increase in the number of Afghan refugees seeking asylum in Australia
 2001: Vietnam is officially recognised as a source country for refugees in Australia.
 2002: The first Cambodian-born member of the Australian Parliament, Tom Koutsantonis, is elected.
 2006: The Australian government apologises to the Chinese community for the White Australia policy and the effects it had on the Chinese community.
 2010s: The number of Indians in Australia reaches over 500,000, making it one of the largest migrant communities in Australia.
 2010s: The Filipino community in Australia continues to grow, with Filipinos now making up the fourth largest group of overseas-born residents in the country.
 2010s: The Vietnamese Australian community continues to grow and thrive, with Vietnamese Australians making significant contributions to Australian society in a variety of fields.
 2010s: The Korean community in Australia continues to thrive, with a strong presence in many major cities and a vibrant culture that includes food, music, and festivals.
 2010s: The number of Afghan refugees arriving in Australia begins to decrease as conditions in Afghanistan improve. Afghan Australians continue to make significant contributions to Australian society in a variety of fields, including business, education, and the arts
 2010s: Taiwanese Australians continue to contribute to Australian culture and economy, with many running successful businesses and participating in various cultural and community events
 2018: The Australian government marks the 200th anniversary of Mak Sai Ying's arrival in Australia and the contribution of Chinese Australians to the country.
 2020s: Indian migration to Australia continues to grow, with Indians making up a significant portion of the Australian population. Many Indian Australians have achieved success in various fields, including business, politics, and the arts.
 2020s- The Nepalese community in Australia continues to thrive, with Nepalese cultural organizations and events held throughout the country. The Nepalese Australian Women's Association is established to support and empower Nepalese women in Australia.

Timeline of key legislation and judicial rulings 

 1855 Chinese Immigration Act, which imposed a tax on Chinese immigrants in Victoria.
 1861 Chinese Immigration Act, imposed a tax on Chinese immigrants in an effort to restrict their migration to Australia, is later amended to exclude "all Chinese from entering the colony".
 1870 Naturalization Act, which granted British subjects the right to become naturalised citizens of Australia, but excluded "any person of Asiatic race" from this right.
 1877 Chinese Immigration Amendment Act, which extended the tax to all of Australia and required Chinese immigrants to obtain a certificate of exemption from the tax before landing.
 1881 Influx of Chinese Restriction Act, which imposed a tax on Chinese immigrants in an attempt to limit their numbers in Australia.
 1901 Immigration Restriction Act, effectively bans non-European immigration to Australia.
 1914 War Precautions Act, restricted the freedom of groups and individuals thought to be a threat, including those critical of Australia's involvement in World War I. These measures required individuals with connections to enemy nations to register as 'aliens' and many were interned in camps across the country. During World War II, Japanese Australians, many of whom were Australian citizens, were also interned as "enemy aliens" and sent to camps in New South Wales, Queensland, and South Australia. 
 1945 Darwin Lands Acquisition Act, forcibly acquired land owned by Chinese Australians in Darwin, ending the local Chinatown. Proposed as a means of "eliminating undesirable elements," the act resulted in the destruction of homes and businesses in the area.
 1948 Nationality and Citizenship Act, established Australian citizenship as a legal status separate from British nationality. It also established the process for acquiring Australian citizenship through birth, descent, adoption, or naturalisation. The act also included provisions for the loss of Australian citizenship, such as through marriage to a foreign national or through membership in a foreign military organization.
 1958 Migration Act, which established the legal framework for the management of immigration to Australia.
 1975 Racial Discrimination Act, made it unlawful to discriminate against a person on the grounds of their race, colour, descent, or national or ethnic origin. This act also established the Human Rights and Equal Opportunity Commission (HREOC) to deal with complaints of racial discrimination and to promote understanding and acceptance of the principle of equal rights. The act applies to various areas of public life, including employment, education, and the provision of goods and services.
This is not an exhaustive list, and there may be other legislation and judicial rulings that are relevant to the history of Asians in Australia.

See also 

 Asian Australians
 Asian immigration to Australia
 History of Asian Americans

Notes

References

Citations

Works cited
  
 

 
 
History by ethnic group
Immigration to Australia
Social history of Australia